"South Street" is a song written by Dave Appell and Kal Mann and performed by The Orlons.  It reached #3 on the U.S. pop chart and #4 on the U.S. R&B chart in 1963.  It was featured on their 1963 album South Street by The Orlons.

The single sold over one million copies and was awarded gold disc status.

The song ranked #47 on Billboard magazine's Top 100 singles of 1963.

Other versions
Al Caiola and His Orchestra released a version of the song on their 1963 album Greasy Kid Stuff.
Sammy Lowe released a version of the song on his 1963 album Hitsville, U.S.A.
Brian Poole & The Tremeloes released a version of the song on their 1963 album Twist and Shout.

References

1963 songs
1963 singles
Songs written by Dave Appell
Songs with lyrics by Kal Mann
The Tremeloes songs